Daniël De Cubber (born 19 April 1954) is a former Belgian footballer. He played as defensive midfielder.

Honours

Player 

 Club Brugge

 Belgian First Division: 1975–76, 1976–77, 1977–78
 Belgian Cup: 1976–77; 1978-79 (finalists), 1982-83 (finalists)
 UEFA Cup: 1975-76 (runners-up)
 European Champion Clubs' Cup: 1977-78 (runners-up)
 Jules Pappaert Cup: 1978
 Bruges Matins: 1981

References 

1954 births
Living people
Belgian footballers
Club Brugge KV players
Association football midfielders